Rhochmopterum seniorwhitei is a species of tephritid or fruit flies in the genus Rhochmopterum of the family Tephritidae.

Distribution
Sri Lanka.

References

Tephritinae
Insects described in 1926
Taxa named by Mario Bezzi
Diptera of Asia